Bagong Silang or Barangay 176 is a barangay of Caloocan, Metro Manila, Philippines. It is known for being the most populous barangay in the Philippines, with a population of 261,729 according to the 2020 census. It is also the northernmost barangay of Metro Manila located in the northern section of the city bordering the province of Bulacan.

History
The barangay occupies parts of land originally of Tala Estate, which is historically under the jurisdiction of the town of Novaliches before it was absorbed by Caloocan in 1903. The  estate was reserved and acquired by the government in 1938 primarily for a leprosarium, which turned out to be the Central Luzon Sanitarium (present-day Dr. Jose N. Rodriguez Memorial Hospital); however, only one-third of the land was used for such purpose. Due to advancements in medical science that no longer requires the segregation of hansenites, the leprosarium needed lesser land area, paving the way for housing and urban development in the area. The barangay was established during the term of President Ferdinand Marcos in 1971. The name of the barangay corresponds to the English word newborn, meant to signify renewed hope for its residents who were resettled from their original slum areas in Tondo, Manila, Commonwealth in Quezon City, and San Juan.

Geography
The barangay is located in North Caloocan. The Marilao River flows along the northern and western borders of the barangay, separating it from Bulacan. Barangays 174, 175 and 178 lie south of Bagong Silang, while Barangays 187 and 188 lie on the east.

Bagong Silang is the largest barangay in the country in terms of population, being more populous than about two-thirds of the cities in the country. Due to the large population, addresses in the barangay are formatted as Phase, Package, Block and Lot.

Demography

Bagong Silang is also the largest barangay in terms of population with over 261,000 residents which accounts for about 16 percent of Caloocan's total population. Bagong Silang became the relocation site of people living in slum areas across Metro Manila since the 1970s greatly contributing to Bagong Silang's population.

Schools
There are seven public elementary schools and 3 public high schools in Bagong Silang.

Elementary:
Bagong Silang Elementary School – Phase 1, Bagong Silang, Caloocan
Sto. Niño Elementary School – Phase 1, Bagong Silang, Caloocan
Gabriela Silang Elementary School (former Bagong Silang Elementary School – Annex) – Phase 1, Bagong Silang, Caloocan
Rene Cayetano Elementary School – Phase 8B, Bagong Silang, Caloocan
Pag-asa Elementary School – Phase 7B Bagong Silang, Caloocan
Silanganan Elementary School – Phase 3, Bagong Silang, Caloocan
Star Elementary School – Phase 1, Bagong Silang, Caloocan
Kalayaan Elementary School – Phase 10B, Bagong Silang, Caloocan

High School:
Bagong Silang High School – Phase 3, Bagong Silang, Caloocan
Benigno Aquino Jr. High School – Phase 2, Bagong Silang, Caloocan
Kalayaan National High School – Phase 10B, Bagong Silang, High School
Tala High School – Phase 5, Bagong Silang, Caloocan

Proposed partition
In September 2013, it was proposed that the barangay to be divided into seven smaller barangays to alleviate perceived issues in its administration. It was reported that residents complained that due to the barangay's size, both in terms of land area and population, government services were spread thin.

Gallery

References

Caloocan
Barangays of Metro Manila